The 1996 America East men's basketball tournament was hosted by the Delaware Blue Hens at Bob Carpenter Center . The final was held at Daskalakis Athletic Center on the campus of Drexel University. Drexel gained its third consecutive America East Conference Championship and an automatic berth to the NCAA tournament with its win over Boston University. Drexel was given the 12th seed in the West Regional of the NCAA Tournament, defeated Memphis in the first round 75–63, and lost in the second round to Syracuse 69–58.

Bracket and results

See also
America East Conference

References

America East Conference men's basketball tournament
1995–96 North Atlantic Conference men's basketball season
College basketball tournaments in Delaware
College basketball tournaments in Pennsylvania
Basketball competitions in Philadelphia
Drexel Dragons men's basketball